Libellula flavida, the yellow-sided skimmer, is a species of skimmer in the family of dragonflies known as Libellulidae. It is found in North America.

The IUCN conservation status of Libellula flavida is "LC", least concern, with no immediate threat to the species' survival. The population is stable.

References

Further reading

External links

 

Libellulidae
Articles created by Qbugbot
Insects described in 1842